Michael Schäffer, Schaefer, Schafer, or Shafer may refer to:

 Michael P. Schaefer (1946–2013), member of the Pennsylvania State Senate from 1977 to 1980
 Michael Schaefer (producer), German film producer
 Mike Schaefer (born 1938), American politician
 Michael Schäfer (born 1959), Danish footballer and manager
 Mike Schafer, Canadian-American ice hockey coach
 Mike Schafer (author) (born 1949), American author
 Michael Schäffer (curler) (born 1968), German curler
 Michael Schaffer (journalist), American journalist
 Michael Schäffer (lutenist) (1937–1978), German lutenist
 Michael Shafer (born 1972), American basketball coach

See also
 Michael Schaeffer House, a historic home in Evansville, Indiana
 Michaelshaffera, a genus of snout moths